The Light from Lund (Swedish: Ljuset från Lund) is a 1955 Swedish comedy film directed by Hans Lagerkvist and starring Nils Poppe, Ann-Marie Gyllenspetz and Karl-Arne Holmsten. It was shot at the Råsunda Studios in Stockholm and on location at Lund in Scania. The film's sets were designed by the art director P.A. Lundgren. It was the third in a series of films feature Poppe in the role of Sten Stensson.

Cast
 Nils Poppe as Sten Stensson Stéen
 Ann-Marie Gyllenspetz as Anna
 Karl-Arne Holmsten as 	Bengt Lundberg
 Carl Ström as 	Dean
 Helge Hagerman as 	Josua Carlander
 Jullan Kindahl as Steen's mother
 Ludde Juberg as 	Steen's father
 Naemi Briese as 	Miss Signe
 Harry Ahlin as 	Rosenblom
 Per Björkman as 	Jönsson
 Kenneth Hultberg as Pelle
 Anders Ekman as 	Lennart
 Hanny Schedin as 	Protester 
 Wilma Malmlöf as 	Protester
 Olav Riégo as Bisterkvist 
 Siegfried Fischer as	Hökar Olsson
 John Norrman as 	Hult 
 Arne Lindblad as 	Vestryman 
 Ulf Johansson as Clergyman 
 Svea Holst as 	Mrs. Wallin 
 Georg Skarstedt as 	Sigurdsson

References

Bibliography 
 Qvist, Per Olov & von Bagh, Peter. Guide to the Cinema of Sweden and Finland. Greenwood Publishing Group, 2000.

External links 
 

1955 films
Swedish comedy films
1955 comedy films
1950s Swedish-language films
Films directed by Hans Lagerkvist
Swedish black-and-white films
1950s Swedish films